The Pennsylvania is a historic apartment building located at Indianapolis, Indiana.  It was built in 1906, and is a three-story, double "H" plan, Classical Revival style red brick and grey limestone building.  It features a round arched main entrance, wrought iron balcony grills, and terra cotta coping.

It was listed on the National Register of Historic Places in 1983.

References

Apartment buildings in Indiana
Residential buildings on the National Register of Historic Places in Indiana
Neoclassical architecture in Indiana
Residential buildings completed in 1906
Residential buildings in Indianapolis
National Register of Historic Places in Indianapolis
1906 establishments in Indiana